Abegesta reluctalis is a moth in the family Crambidae. It was described by George Duryea Hulst in 1886. It is found in North America, where it has been recorded from Arizona, California, Maryland and New Mexico.

The wingspan is about 15–16 mm. The forewings are golden with a brownish shade and two white lines. The hindwings are white, washed with fuscous ochreous at the base. Adults have been recorded on wing from June to September.

References

Glaphyriinae
Moths described in 1886
Moths of North America